Andrew Sean Greer (born November 1970) is an American novelist and short story writer. Greer received the 2018 Pulitzer Prize for Fiction for his novel Less. He is the author of The Story of a Marriage, which The New York Times has called an “inspired, lyrical novel,” and The Confessions of Max Tivoli, which was named one of the best books of 2004 by the San Francisco Chronicle and received a California Book Award.

Biography
Andrew Sean Greer was born in November 1970, in Washington, D.C., the child of two scientists. He grew up in Rockville, Maryland. He is an identical twin. He graduated from Georgetown Day School, and Brown University, where he studied with Robert Coover and Edmund White, and served as commencement speaker. He lives part-time in Italy.
He is the author of six works of fiction. Greer taught at Freie Universität Berlin and the Iowa Writers Workshop. He was a finalist for the Premio von Rezzori for a work translated into Italian, as well as a Today Show pick, a New York Public Library Cullman Center Fellow, and NEA Fellow, and a judge for the National Book Award.

Work
His stories have appeared in Esquire, The Paris Review, The New Yorker and other national publications, and have been anthologized most recently in The Book of Other People, and The PEN/O. Henry Prize Stories 2009.

His third book, The Confessions of Max Tivoli, was released in 2004; a New Yorker piece by John Updike called it “enchanting, in the perfumed, dandified style of disenchantment brought to grandeur by Proust and Nabokov.” Mitch Albom then chose The Confessions of Max Tivoli for the Today Show Book Club and it soon became a bestseller. The story of a man aging backwards, it was inspired by the Bob Dylan song "My Back Pages." It is similar in theme to the Fitzgerald short story and the film The Curious Case of Benjamin Button.

Greer's fourth book The Story of a Marriage was published in 2008. The New York Times said of it: "Mr. Greer seamlessly choreographs an intricate narrative that speaks authentically to the longings and desires of his characters. All the while he never strays from the convincing and steady voice of Pearlie." The Washington Post called it "thoughtful, complex and exquisitely written."

The Impossible Lives of Greta Wells was published in June 2013.

His novel Less was published in 2017  and received the 2018 Pulitzer Prize. A follow up, Less is Lost, was published in 2022 and debuted on The New York Times Best Sellers list.

Awards and prizes
 Northern California Book Award
 California Book Award
 New York Public Library Young Lions Fiction Award
 Fellowships from the National Endowment for the Arts and the New York Public Library.
 O. Henry Award for the short story, "Darkness".
 Fernanda Pivano Award 2014 for American Literature in Italy.
 Pulitzer Prize for Fiction 2018 for his novel Less.
 PEN Oakland Josephine Miles Literary Award 2018 for Less.

Bibliography

Novels
The Path of Minor Planets: A Novel (2001) 
 The Confessions of Max Tivoli (2004) 
 The Story of a Marriage (2008) 
 The Impossible Lives of Greta Wells (2013) 
 Less: A Novel (2017) 
 Less Is Lost (2022) ISBN 9780316498906

Short fiction 
Collections
 How It Was for Me (short stories) (2000) 
Stories

References

External links
 Andrew Sean Greer website

1970 births
Living people
21st-century American novelists
21st-century American short story writers
21st-century American male writers
American male novelists
American male short story writers
Brown University alumni
American gay writers
Identical twins
American LGBT novelists
Pulitzer Prize for Fiction winners
The New Yorker people
American twins
University of Montana alumni
Writers from California
Writers from Washington, D.C.
Georgetown Day School alumni
21st-century LGBT people